Solomon Robert Guggenheim (February 2, 1861 – November 3, 1949) was an American businessman and art collector. He is best known for establishing the Solomon R. Guggenheim Foundation and the Solomon R. Guggenheim Museum in New York City.

Guggenheim was born into a wealthy mining family, and he founded the Yukon Gold Company in Alaska, among other business interests. He began collecting art in the 1890s, and he retired from his business after World War I to pursue art collecting. He eventually focused on modern art under the guidance of artist Baroness Hilla von Rebay, creating an important collection by the 1930s and opened his first museum in 1939.

Early life, family and education
Guggenheim was born in Philadelphia, Pennsylvania, son of Meyer and Barbara Guggenheim and brother of Simon, Benjamin, Daniel, and five other siblings. He was of Swiss and Ashkenazi Jewish ancestry.

Guggenheim was a student in Switzerland at the Concordia Institute in Zürich.

Career
In 1891, he turned around the Compañia de la Gran Fundición Nacional Mexicana. Guggenheim returned to the United States to work in the family mining business, later founding the Yukon Gold Company in the Yukon Territory and Alaska.

Art collector
He began collecting works of the old masters in the 1890s.  He retired from his business in 1919 to devote more time to art collecting and in 1926, met Baroness Hilla von Rebay. In 1930, they visited Wassily Kandinsky’s studio in Dessau, Germany, and Guggenheim began to purchase Kandinsky's work.  The same year, Guggenheim began to display the collection to the public at his apartment in the Plaza Hotel in New York City.  Guggenheim's purchases continued with the works of Rudolf Bauer, Marc Chagall, Fernand Léger, and László Moholy-Nagy.

Foundation and museum
In 1937, Guggenheim established the Solomon R. Guggenheim Foundation to foster the appreciation of modern art, and in 1939, he and his art advisor, Baroness Rebay, opened a venue for the display of his collection, the Museum of Non-Objective Painting, at 24 East 54th Street in New York City. Under Rebay's guidance, Guggenheim sought to include in the collection the most important examples of non-objective art available at the time, such as  Kandinsky's Composition 8 (1923), Léger's Contrast of Forms (1913) and Robert Delaunay's Simultaneous Windows (2nd Motif, 1st Part)'' (1912).

By the early 1940s, the museum had accumulated such a large collection of avant-garde paintings that the need for a permanent building to house the art collection had become apparent. In 1943, Guggenheim and Rebay commissioned architect Frank Lloyd Wright to design a new museum building. In 1948, the collection was greatly expanded through the purchase of art dealer Karl Nierendorf's  estate of some 730 objects, notably German expressionist paintings. By that time, the museum's collection included a broad spectrum of expressionist and surrealist works, including paintings by Paul Klee, Oskar Kokoschka and Joan Miró.

The museum was renamed the Solomon R. Guggenheim Museum in 1952, after Solomon Guggenheim's death in 1949. Its new building opened in New York City on October 21, 1959.

Personal life and demise
Solomon Guggenheim married Irene Rothschild, daughter of Victor Henry Rothschild, in 1895. These Rothschilds were not related to the Rothschild banking family. Solomon and Irene's children were Eleanor May (1896–1992; later Lady Castle Stewart after her marriage to Arthur Stuart, 7th Earl Castle Stewart), Gertrude (1898–1966) and Barbara Guggenheim (1904–1985).

Guggenheim died in 1949 on Long Island, New York.

Legacy
In addition to the New York Museum, the Guggenheim Foundation operates, among other things, the Peggy Guggenheim Collection in Venice, which was established by Guggenheim's niece, Peggy Guggenheim.

See also
 Guggenheim family

Citations

General and cited references

External links

 
 

1861 births
1949 deaths
19th-century art collectors
20th-century art collectors
American art collectors
American people of Swiss-Jewish descent
American philanthropists
Burials at Salem Fields Cemetery
Businesspeople from Philadelphia
Solomon R. Guggenheim
Jewish American art collectors
Jewish American philanthropists
Museum founders